Portobello, Porto Bello, Porto Belo, Portabello, or Portabella may refer to:

Places

Brazil
 Porto Belo

Ireland
 Portobello, Dublin
 Cathal Brugha Barracks, Dublin formerly Portobello Barracks

Italy
 Portobello, Italy

New Zealand
 Portobello, New Zealand, on Otago Peninsula
 Portobello Bay, on Otago Peninsula near the town of Portobello
 Portobello Peninsula, a spur of Otago Peninsula

Panama
 Portobelo, Colón

United Kingdom
 Portobello, Edinburgh
 Portobello Road, London
 Portobello, an area south-east of Birtley
 Portobello, West Midlands
 Portobello, a housing estate in Wakefield, West Yorkshire

United States
 Portabello Estate, Corona Del Mar, California; previously owned by American businessman Frank Pritt
 Porto Bello (Drayden, Maryland)
 Porto Bello (Williamsburg, Virginia)

Other uses
 Porto Bello (Caribbean), a fictional British colony in the Long John Silver film and The Adventures of Long John Silver TV series
 Portobello mushroom
 Portobello (novel), a 2008 novel by Ruth Rendell
 Portobello House, Vale of Glamorgan, South Wales

See also
 Portobello railway station (disambiguation)
 Battle of Porto Bello (disambiguation)